Euthulla is a rural locality in the Maranoa Region, Queensland, Australia.

Geography 
The locality is loosely bounded by Bungeworgorai Creek to the west.

The Carnarvon Highway enters the locality from the south (Orange Hill) and exits to the north (Eumamurrin).

There are a number of neighbourhoods within the locality, which take their names from railway sidings on the now-closed Roma-to-Injune railway line which ran through the west of the location along the now Oralla Road. From Roma heading north, the neighbourhoods/stations were:

 Tineen
Minka
Euthulla 
 Nullawurt
 Yingerbay (
There is another neighbourhood in the centre of the locality (not associated with the railway): Tabers

The land use is predominantly grazing on native vegetation with some cropping. Most of the residential areas are just outside the boundaries of Roma.

History 
The locality takes its name Euthulla from the railway station name, given by Queensland Railways Department on 30 November 1916, supposedly an Aboriginal word, meaning unknown.

The neighbourhood Minka also takes it name from a railway station assigned by the Railways Department on 29 April 1915, and is an Aboriginal word referring to a species of tree.

The neighbourhood Nullawurt also takes its name from a railway station and is an Aboriginal word for an Acacia (wattle) species of tree. It was assigned from 11 November 1915, from a suggestion from the Orallo Farmers and Settlers Association.

The neighbourhood name Tineen also comes from a railway station name, assigned on 16 October 1926, being an Aboriginal word, meaning mosquito.

The neighbourhood Yingerbay is again the name of a railway station assigned on 11 November 1915, and taken from a pastoral run established in 1854, from the  Mandandanji language, meaning a place of freshwater crayfish (yabbie).

Euthulla Provisional School opened circa 1889. On 1 January 1909 it became Euthulla State School and closed circa 1921. In 1927 it reopened but closed finally in 1931.

Education 
There are no schools in the locality. The nearest primary and secondary school is Roma State College in Roma to the south.

References 

Maranoa Region
Localities in Queensland